The Saslonch, Sassolungo or Langkofel (3,181m) is the highest mountain of the Langkofel Group in the Dolomites in South Tyrol, Italy. The name translates to "long peak" / "long rock" in all three languages. It stands over the Ladin community of Val Gardena.

Climbing
The mountain is a serious climb, and it is essential to bring full climbing equipment. Pitons line the main routes. The normal route starts at the Sella Pass, at about 2,200m above sea level. Paul Grohmann was the first to reach the summit in 1869.

References 

 Alpenverein South Tyrol

External links 

Mountains of the Alps
Mountains of South Tyrol
Alpine three-thousanders
Dolomites